The 7th Guldbagge Awards ceremony, presented by the Swedish Film Institute, honored the best Swedish films of 1969 and 1970, and took place on 26 October 1970. A Swedish Love Story and Mistreatment were presented with the award for Best Film.

Awards
 Best Film: 
 A Swedish Love Story by Roy Andersson
 Mistreatment by Lars Lennart Forsberg
 Best Director: Lars Lennart Forsberg for Mistreatment
 Best Actor: Carl-Gustaf Lindstedt for Harry Munter
 Best Actress: Anita Ekström for Jänken
 Special Achievement: Harry Schein

References

External links
Official website
Guldbaggen on Facebook
Guldbaggen on Twitter
7th Guldbagge Awards at Internet Movie Database

1970 in Sweden
1970 film awards
Guldbagge Awards ceremonies
1970s in Stockholm
October 1970 events in Europe